Henry Wardle (1881–1918) was an English professional footballer who played as an inside forward for Sunderland.

References

1881 births
1918 deaths
Footballers from Sunderland
English footballers
Association football inside forwards
Sunderland A.F.C. players
South Shields F.C. (1889) players
North Shields F.C. players
English Football League players